Frederic Monneyron is a French writer and academic.

Life 
Born in Paris to Swiss descent, Monneyron spent his youth in the United Kingdom and Sweden, later living in Africa, Morocco and the United States. Monneyron currently lives in Montpellier, France.

Monneyron received his Doctorat d'Etat en science politique from the University of Montpellier I in 1984 and his Doctorat d'Etat ès lettres et sciences humaines from the University of Paris IV-Sorbonne in 1986. He taught at the University of California, the University of Abidjan, and the Cadi Ayyad University between 1980 and 1988.  Monneyron taught at the University of Burgundy, the University of South Florida and Stendhal University between 1988 and 1998.

Monneyron is a full Professor in comparative and general literature at the University of Perpignan Via Domitia and is the head of the MBA "Fashion industries and luxury goods" at Mod'Art International, Paris, coming to teach sociology of fashion in the English-taught programme. He also teaches sociology, political science and aesthetics at the University Paul Valéry-Montpellier and sociology of fashion at the University of Geneva and at the University of Barcelona and is a Distinguished visiting professor at the University of South Florida, the University of Milan and the University of Bologna. Besides, he is an expert to the European Commission in Brussels (research directorate).

His works focused on sexuality, gender relations (Thèse d'Etat es lettres et sciences humaines : L'Imaginaire androgyne ; L'Ecriture de la jalousie ; Séduire), clothes, fashion and luxury (La Frivolité essentielle ; La Mode et ses enjeux, La Sociologie de la mode, La Photographie de mode, Le Luxe, L'Imaginaire du luxe) on the one hand ; on the ideas of nation and race (La Nation aujourd'hui, L'Imaginaire racial, L'Idée de race), on Europe (Thèse d'Etat de science politique: Les Neutres et l'intégration européenne) and the USA (Au Cœur des Etats-Unis) on the other hand.

He is the author of more than thirty books translated in major languages and is the editor of around fifteen collective works among which five conferences he organized at the Cerisy International Center (L'Androgyne, La Jalousie, La Misogynie, Le Masculin, Le Vêtement)
.

He is also a novelist (Dossier diplomatique, Le Voyage d'un séducteur, Le Nihiliste) and a short stories writer (Sans Nom et autres nouvelles) and a translator from English into French (A. K. Coomaraswamy, E. Wharton, P. G. Wodehouse, T.D. Allman)

On topics such as fashion, luxury, sexuality and seduction, he granted numerous interviews to the magazines and the radio and appeared on television programmes.

Bibliography

Essays

L'Androgyne romantique. Du mythe au mythe littéraire (Grenoble, ELLUG, 1994, ; 2009)
L'Androgyne décadent. Mythe, figure, fantasmes (Grenoble, ELLUG, 1996, ; 2011)
L'Écriture de la jalousie (Grenoble, ELLUG, 1996)
Bisexualité et littérature. Autour de D. H. Lawrence et Virginia Woolf, (Paris, L'Harmattan, 1998)
Séduire, l'imaginaire de la séduction de Don Giovanni à Mick Jagger (Paris, PUF, 1997, ; 2000; Paris, Imago, 2016)
La Nation aujourd'hui. Formes et mythes (Paris, L'Harmattan, 2000)
La Frivolité essentielle. Du vêtement et de la mode (Paris, PUF, 2001, ; paperback Quadrige, 2008, 2014)
Mythes et littérature (Paris, PUF, 2002, ; 2012, with Joël Thomas, translated in Spanish)
L'imaginaire racial (Paris, L'Harmattan, 2004)
La Mode et ses enjeux (Paris, Klincksieck, 2005, ; 2010, translated in Spanish and Portuguese)
L'Automobile. Un imaginaire contemporain (Paris, Imago, 2006, ; with Joël Thomas)
La Sociologie de la mode (Paris, PUF, 2006, ; 2010, 2013, 2015, 2017, 2019, 2021, translated in Japanese and Italian)
Sociologie de l'imaginaire, with Patrick Legros, Patrick Tacussel et Jean-Bruno Renard (Paris, Armand Colin, coll. Cursus, 2006, translated in Portuguese)
Le Monde hippie. De l'imaginaire psychédélique à la révolution informatique (Paris, Imago, 2008 , with Martine Xiberras)
La Photographie de mode. Un art souverain (Paris, PUF, coll. Perspectives critiques, 2010)
Au cœur des États-Unis. Mythes, imaginaires et fictions (Paris, Michel Houdiard Éditeur, 2011,)
L'Idée de race. Histoire d'une fiction (Paris, Berg International, 2012, with Gérard Siary)
Vanity. Mode/Fotografie aus der Sammlung F.C. Gunlach (Wien, Kunsthalle für Moderne Kunst, Stiftung F.C. Gundlach, 2012, mit Synne Genzmer)
La Séduction, (UPPR, 2015, ; 2016)
La Mode, (UPPR, 2015, ; 2016)
Le Luxe, (UPPR, 2015, ; 2017)
L'Imaginaire du luxe (Paris, Imago, 2015, with Patrick Mathieu)
Luxe (Paris, Michel de Maule, 2017, with Patrick Mathieu)
Mythe et nation (UPPR, 2017)
Des sexes et des genres (UPPR, 2019)
 Mythe et race (Entremises, 2021, (ISBN 978-2-38255-068-7))
 De la beauté (Entremises, 2022, (ISBN 978-2382550267))
 Nations, races, sexes. Pérennité et changement de mythes (Brussels, EME, 2022, (ISBN 978-2-8066-3762-8))

Editor

L'Androgyne dans la littérature (Paris, Albin-Michel, 1990, ; Dervy-Livre, 2000, translated in Japanese)
Misogynies (Paris, Deux Temps/Tierce, 1993)
La Jalousie (Paris, L'Harmattan, 1996)
Le Masculin, Identité, fictions, dissémination (Paris, L'Harmattan, 1998)
Le Vêtement (Paris, L'Harmattan, 2001)
Vêtement et littérature (PUP, 2001)
L'Entre-deux de la mode (Paris, L'Harmattan/Bergamo University Press, 2004)
Automobile et littérature (PUP, 2005)
La France dans le regard des États-Unis/France as Seen by the United States (PUP/PUPV, 2007)
Métaphysique de la mode (Paris/Bruxelles, Éditions du Cercle d'art, 2008)
Des mythes politiques (Paris, Imago, 2010, translated in Croatian)
Sport et imaginaire (PULM, 2013)

Prefaces

Hela Ouardi (dir), L'Androgyne en littérature (Simpact, 2009)
Michel Dion et Mariette Julien, Éthique de la mode féminine (PUF, 2010)
Gilbert Durand, Chaque âge à ses plaisirs (Entremises, 2023, ISBN 978-2-37168-343-3))

Fiction

Sans nom et autres nouvelles (Paris, L'Harmattan, 1999)
Dossier diplomatique (Paris, Michel de Maule, 2014)
Le Voyage d'un séducteur (CSIPP, 2018)
Le Nihiliste (Paris, Sydney Laurent, 2019,)
 Après le désir (KDP, 2019)
 Une vie de piscines (Entremises, 2023 (ISBN 978-2382550922))

Translations (from English into French)

A. K. Coomaraswamy, La Philosophie chrétienne et orientale de l'art (Pardès, 1990)
Edith Wharton, Voyage au Maroc (Paris/Monaco, Ed. du Rocher, 1996, ; rééd. Paris, Gallimard-L'Etrangère, 1998, puis Paris, Gallimard-L'imaginaire, 2001)
P.G. Wodehouse, Courtes histoires de green (Paris, Michel de Maule, 2011)
T.D. Allman, La Floride, coeur révélateur des Etats-Unis (Paris, Classiques Garnier, 2019)

Quotation
« Quand on change de vêtement, on change de comportement ». Excerpt from Libération - September 1, 2001.

References

French male short story writers
French short story writers
French essayists
French male essayists
Writers from Paris
Living people
Year of birth missing (living people)
University of Montpellier alumni
Paris-Sorbonne University alumni
Academic staff of Université Félix Houphouët-Boigny
Academic staff of the University of Burgundy
University of South Florida faculty
Academic staff of the University of Geneva
Academic staff of the University of Barcelona
Academic staff of the University of Milan
Academic staff of the University of Bologna